This article is about the particular significance of the year 1930 to Wales and its people.

Incumbents

Archbishop of Wales – Alfred George Edwards, Bishop of St Asaph
Archdruid of the National Eisteddfod of Wales – Pedrog

Events
17 March - The South Wales Daily Post and Cambria Daily Leader merge in Swansea.
9 May - An elephant from the Monmouth mop fair escapes, and wades in the River Monnow before recapture.
13 September - Rhosydd Quarry ceases slate production. Neighbouring Croesor Quarry also closes this year.
24 December - In London, Harry Grindell Matthews demonstrates his device to project pictures to the clouds.
unknown date
Production begins at Cefn Coed Colliery, the world's deepest anthracite mine.
The Crumlin branch of the Monmouthshire & Brecon Canal is closed.
The first youth hostel of the Youth Hostels Association, the first in the UK, is opened at Pennant Hall in the Conwy valley near Llanrwst.
A. H. Dodd succeeds Sir John Edward Lloyd as Professor of History at University of Wales, Bangor.
Gareth Richard Vaughan Jones becomes Foreign Affairs Secretary to David Lloyd George.
John Edward Jones becomes Secretary of Plaid Cymru.
Thomas Lewis becomes first chairman of the Medical Research Society.

Arts and literature
The first Welsh Books Festival is held in Cardiff.
John Ballinger, first Librarian of the National Library of Wales, is knighted for his services to librarianship.

Awards
National Eisteddfod of Wales (held in Llanelli)
National Eisteddfod of Wales: Chair - David Emrys James, "Y Galilead"
National Eisteddfod of Wales: Crown - William Jones

New books

English language
David Davies - The Problem of the Twentieth Century
Saunders Lewis - MonicaKenneth Morris - Book of the Three Dragons
Bertrand Russell - The Conquest of Happiness
Hilda Vaughan - Her Father's House
Edward Williamson - The Story of Llandaff Cathedral

Welsh language
Edward Tegla Davies - Y Doctor Bach

Music
The Three Valleys Festival is launched.
Caniedydd Newydd yr Ysgol Sul (collection of hymns)
Peter Warlock – Carillon Carilla
Grace Williams - Hen Walia

Film
Symphony in Two Flats, starring Ivor Novello, an adaptation of Novello's West End play

Broadcasting
9 March – The BBC Regional Programme service replaces BBC local stations.

Sport
Cricket - Maurice Turnbull is the first Welsh player to be capped for England.

Births
28 January - David Morris, politician (died 2007)
7 February - Peter Jones, sports broadcaster (died 1990)
7 March (in London) - Antony Armstrong-Jones, 1st Earl of Snowdon, photographer (died 2017)
7 April - Cliff Morgan, rugby player and television presenter (died 2013)
10 May - June Knox-Mawer, née Ellis, romantic novelist and radio broadcaster (died 2006)
28 June - Edward Millward, politician (died 2020)
1 July - Ron Hughes, footballer
9 July - Stuart Williams, footballer (died 2013)
10 July - Wyn Roberts, Baron Roberts of Conwy, politician (died 2013)
14 July - R. H. Williams, rugby player
8 August - Terry Nation, screenwriter (died 1997)
28 August (in London) - Windsor Davies, actor (died 2019 in France)
1 September - Emrys James, actor (died 1989)
21 September - John Morgan, comedian (died 2004)
23 September - Ellis Evans, academic (died 2013)
14 October - Alan Williams, politician (died 2014)
19 October - Mavis Nicholson, television presenter (died 2022)
11 November - Vernon Handley, conductor (died 2008)
12 November - Irma Chilton, children's writer in Welsh and English (died 1990)
4 December - Brian Morris, Baron Morris of Castle Morris, poet and critic (died 2001)
12 December (in London) - Gwyneth Dunwoody, politician (died 2008)
date unknown - Aneurin Jones, painter (died 2017)

Deaths
18 January - Bobby Lloyd, rugby player, 41
26 January - Harry Jones, rugby player, 51
25 March - John Gwenogvryn Evans, palaeographer, 78
1 May - Richard Bell, politician, 70
28 May - Cliff Williams, Wales international rugby union player, 32
15 June - John Cynddylan Jones, theologian, 90
17 June - Hugh Robert Jones, Nationalist leader, 36
22 June - Mary Davies, singer, 75
23 June - Ben Davies, Wales international rugby player, 57
June - David Davies, Archdeacon of Llandaff,
August - Huw Robert Jones, politician, 35/6
15 August - R. Silyn Roberts, author, 59
13 September - Jehoida Hodges, rugby player, 53
30 September - Lewis Pryce, Archdeacon of Wrexham, 57
7 October - Margaret Verney, educationist, 85
November - John Hagan Jenkins, politician
8 November - William Williams, Dean of St Davids, 82
27 December - Alfred Mond, 1st Baron Melchett, industrialist, 62

See also 
 1930 in Northern Ireland

References

Wales